Victor Nikolaevich Palmov  (10 October 1888 – 7 June 1929) was a Ukrainian painter of Russian origin and avant-garde artist (Futurist and Neo-primitivist) from the David Burliuk circle.

Biographical dates 

 Victor Palmov was born 10 October 1888 in Samara, in the Samara Governorate of the Russian Empire.
 In 1911–1914 he studied at the Moscow School of Painting, Sculpture and Architecture (MUZHZV).
 In 1920–1921, together with David Burliuk, he travelled to Japan.
 In 1923–1924 Palmov was associated with the Moscow magazine Left Front of the Arts (LEF) — organ of the Constructivists and Formalists.
 Palmov was the founder of the Cvetopisy or Tsv'etopisi (Colour paintings).
 In 1925 he became the member of the Association of the Revolutionary Art of the Ukraine (ARMU) together with David Burliuk, Vadym Meller, Vasiliy Yermilov, Alexander Bogomazov and Alexander Khvostenko-Khvostov.
 In 1927 he was the co-founder of the Contemporary Ukrainian Artists Union (OSMU) together with Alexander Khvostenko-Khvostov, Mark Epshtein and Anatol Petrytsky.
 From 1925 to 1929 he was professor at the Kyiv Art Academy (now the National Academy of Visual Arts and Architecture) together with Alexander Bogomazov, Vadym Meller, and Vladimir Tatlin.
 Victor Palmov died 7 July 1929 in Kyiv, in the Ukrainian SSR of the Soviet Union.

References 

 Kudrytsky A. V. (ed.) 1997, Мистецтво України: Біографічний довідник (in Ukrainian) — Kiev, 1997. — p. 460.  — 

Neo-primitivism
Soviet painters
Ukrainian people of Russian descent
1888 births
1929 deaths
20th-century Ukrainian painters
20th-century Ukrainian male artists
Ukrainian male painters
Moscow School of Painting, Sculpture and Architecture alumni
Ukrainian avant-garde